Raymond Vitte (1949–1983) was an American actor who starred mostly in comedy and drama films in the 1970s and early 1980s. He made numerous guest appearances on television shows and was a cast member of the show Doc in 1976.

Vitte, who had been fevered for days and acting strangely for hours in his Los Angeles home, died in 1983 following a scuffle with two Los Angeles Police Department officers who were transporting Vitte to a nearby hospital for a psychiatric evaluation.

Filmography

In 1981, Vitte also appeared on Gimme a Break as Ken.

Only five episodes of his final show "The Quest" had aired when the series was cancelled in Nov 1982.   Tragically,  Ray Vitte died only 3 months later after the LA police department were called to his home shortly before 11pm  by neighbors saying that a man was shouting and chanting all day.  Ray ordered the officers to leave and allegedly placed a curse on them.  Afterwards  the  actor lunged twice at the two officers who struck  Ray with their nightsticks and sprayed him with mace (pepper spray) with no apparent effect.  The officers in their report said the actor then ran towards an outdoor swimming pool, but fell on the concrete. The actor was then carried screaming to a patrol car in which the officers planned to take him to a hospital for a mental evaluation. Once in the car, however, Ray ceased breathing, In the weeks leading up to this death, Ray suffered from a chronic fever which ran as high as 104 degrees (F). Ray had a battery of  medical tests run just eight days prior to his death. The 20 April 1983 issue of the Palm Springs Desert Sun ran an AP article citing "sickle cell disease and complications" as the official cause of death.

References

External links

1949 births
1983 deaths
American male film actors
African-American male actors
Male actors from New York City
20th-century American male actors
20th-century African-American people